Adrian Senin (born 27 August 1979) is a Romanian former professional football player.

While playing for FC Farul Constanța, Senin was involved in a serious automobile accident in August 2005.

References

External links

 

1979 births
Living people
Sportspeople from Constanța
Romanian footballers
Association football defenders
Liga I players
FCV Farul Constanța players
FC Brașov (1936) players
FC Astra Giurgiu players
FC Delta Dobrogea Tulcea players
Association football midfielders
Romanian football managers